Christopher Farley Ball (born May 7, 1963) is an American football coach and former player. He assumed the position as the head football coach at Northern Arizona University in December 2018.

Head coaching record

References

External links
 Northern Arizona profile

1963 births
Living people
American football defensive backs
Akron Zips football coaches
Alabama Crimson Tide football coaches
Arizona State Sun Devils football coaches
Idaho State Bengals football coaches
Memphis Tigers football coaches
Northern Arizona Lumberjacks football coaches
Pittsburgh Panthers football coaches
Washington State Cougars football coaches
Junior college football coaches in the United States
Coaches of American football from Missouri
Players of American football from St. Louis